The 2014 Lehigh Valley Steelhawks season was the fourth season as a professional indoor football franchise and their second in the Professional Indoor Football League (PIFL). One of 8 teams competing in the PIFL for the 2014 season.

The team played their home games under head coach Chris Thompson at the Stabler Arena in Bethlehem, Pennsylvania. The Steelhawks earned a 6-6 record, placing 2nd in the National Conference, winning the National Conference Championship, before losing to the Nashville Venom in PIFL Cup III.

Schedule
Key:

Regular season
All start times are local to home team

Postseason
All start times are local to home team

Roster

Division Standings

References

External links
2014 Results

Lehigh Valley Steelhawks
Lehigh Valley Steelhawks
Lehigh Valley Steelhawks